William Michael Ferguson (born July 7, 1951) is a former American football linebacker who played two seasons in the National Football League for the New York Jets.  He played college football initially at the University of Washington and concluded at San Diego State University.  Ferguson was drafted in the fourth round of the 1973 NFL Draft.

References

1951 births
Living people
American football linebackers
San Diego State Aztecs football players
New York Jets players
Players of American football from San Diego
Washington Huskies football players